The Toy Collector is a novel written by James Gunn, published by Bloomsbury Publishing in 2000. It is the story of a hospital orderly who steals drugs from the hospital which he sells to help keep his toy collection habit alive.

Although the work is fictional, the name of the protagonist is James Gunn.

The novel flashes back and forth between the character Gunn's drug-addled, sexually abusive adult life, and his life among his childhood friends. Furthermore, we see the lives of Gunn's childhood toys—from Rom, Spaceknight to the Fisher-Price Little People, who seem to have lives and thoughts of their own outside Gunn's world.

Though Gunn started as a novelist after he began in film, he became much more successful as a screenwriter of movies such like 2004's Dawn of the Dead and as writer-director of Slither and the Guardians of the Galaxy films.

Editions
  (hardcover, 2000)
  (paperback, 2001)
  (German edition, 2004)

External links 
JamesGunn.com - James Gunn's Official Site

2000 American novels
Bloomsbury Publishing books
Works by James Gunn
2000 debut novels
Nonlinear narrative novels